Touati Benoukraf (born 1980) is a computational and molecular biologist. He holds a Canada Research Chair in Bioinformatics for Personalized Medicine at Memorial University of Newfoundland since November 2018.
His research focus is on computational epigenomics.

References

External links
Official website at Memorial University of Newfoundland
Canada Research Chairs official website

Living people
1980 births
Academic staff of the Memorial University of Newfoundland
Canada Research Chairs
Aix-Marseille University alumni
Computational biologists
French bioinformaticians